Acaulospora taiwania is a species of fungus in the family Acaulosporaceae. It forms arbuscular mycorrhiza and vesicles in roots. Found in Taiwan growing in association with Taiwania cryptomerioides, it was described as new to science in 1998.

References

Diversisporales
Fungi described in 1998
Fungi of Asia